Pakeezah is a 1972 Indian film directed by Kamal Amrohi.

Pakeezah or Pakeeza may also refer to:

Pakeezah (soundtrack), soundtrack of the film by Naushad and Ghulam Mohammed
 Pakeeza, a 2013 Hindi album by Indian singer Zubeen Garg
 Pakeezah (TV series), a 2016 Pakistani television drama series